Çiftehan is a resort belde (town) in Niğde Province, Turkey

Geography 

Çiftehan is a part of Ulukışla district which in turn is a part of Niğde Province. The population is 1254 as of 2011.

History 
The vicinity was the southern gate of the Roman Province, Cappadocia. A Roman settlement sprung up named Aquae Calidae (meaning 'hot waters' for the nearby thermal springs). The thermal baths around were famous during Roman Empire era and according to unproven claims Cleopatra VII of Ptolemaic Egypt also visited the baths. The spa pools constructed by the Seljuk Turks (11th century-13th century) still survive. But there were no permanent settlements. The village was formed as recently as the first half of the 20th century and after the rapid increase of population the village was declared town.

Economy 

Because of intense forests around Çiftehan, the agricultural income is low. The main economic activity of the town is domestic tourism based on hot springs. There are many spa hotels. The advantage of the town is its location on the  state road connecting Central Anatolia to Mediterranean Region.

References

Spa towns in Turkey
Populated places in Niğde Province
Towns in Turkey
Tourist attractions in Niğde Province
Ulukışla District